Llandrillo may refer to one of the following in Wales:
 Llandrillo, Denbighshire, a village near Corwen
 Coleg Llandrillo Cymru, a multi-campus college in Conwy and Denbighshire
Grŵp Llandrillo Menai, the umbrella group of north-Wales colleges
 Rhos-on-Sea (or Llandrillo-yn-Rhos), a suburb of Colwyn Bay in Conwy